Martha Krug-Genthe (1871–1945) was a German geographer. She was the first woman to obtain a doctorate in geography.

Life 
She obtained a doctorate in geography, in 1901 in Heidelberg, under the supervision of Alfred Hettner.

In her thesis, Martha Krug examined how hydrographic charts are used to map ocean currents. In particular, she analyzed the extension of the Gulf Stream to the northeast, the North American current, in order to draw up a map of knowledge in the field of oceanography.

According to Ginsburger, her doctorate was made possible by a favorable context and environment, at a time when women were not pursuing academic careers. Krug studied under Friedrich Ratzel at the University of Leipzig, a few years after Ellen Churchill Semple, the first known woman geography student in Germany.

In 1901, Krug married Karl Wilhelm Genthe, and joined him in Boston the same year. A zoologist, he was employed in various universities in the United States.

In 1901, National Geographic magazine published a 14-page article she wrote on German geography. She then obtained a teaching position at the Beacon School in Hartford, a secondary school for young women where she taught geography.

She was an expert in school geography, in both countries; she established herself alongside Semple in the Association of American Geographers, and the International Congress of Geography in Washington.

At the 1904 International Geographical Congress in Washington, Martha Krug-Genthe was chosen to deliver the "Tribute", a speech commemorating Friedrich Ratzel, the most influential cultural geographer of that time. She also presents an article on “School geography in the United States” in the section devoted to geography and education, the only section open to women.

She is one of the 48 founding members of the AAG, the only woman alongside Ellen Churchill Semple, and also the only one of the 48 founders of the AAG present in Philadelphia to have a doctorate in geography.

Martha Krug-Genthe was named associate editor of the Bulletin of the American Geographical Society. This affiliation strengthened her professional credentials.

In 1907, the Bulletin of the American Geographical Society published her work Valley Towns of Connecticut. This is a regional study of the economic factors driving the evolution of Hartford's urban system as the preeminent center of the Connecticut River Valley.

In 1911, she returned to Germany, and retired.

Krug-Genthe had a short (a decade) but very visible career, at a very restrictive time for women. Ginsburger mentions that:

References 

1871 births
1945 deaths
German geographers
Women geographers
20th-century geographers
Schoolteachers from Connecticut